Metro (styled as METRO) is a transit network in Minnesota serving the cities of Minneapolis and Saint Paul. It also provides service to some suburban areas. As of 2022 the system consists of two light rail lines (Blue and Green Lines) and five bus rapid transit (BRT) lines (Orange Line, Red Line, A, C, and D Lines) all of which are operated by the local public transit company: Metro Transit. The five lines connect Downtown Minneapolis and St Paul with the Bloomington, Minneapolis-St Paul International Airport, Roseville, Richfield, Burnsville and Brooklyn Center.

Prior to August 17, 2019, service along the entire length of the Green Line operated 24/7, the only one of 22 light rail systems in the United States to do so, but a common practice on some heavy rail lines such as the New York City Subway and PATH. The service gap from 2 a.m. to 4 a.m. was replaced by bus service. Metro Transit also provides 24/7 service between the stations serving the Lindbergh and Humphrey terminals of MSP Airport; the remainder of the Blue Line operates from 3:29 a.m. to 1:54 a.m. Monday through Thursday, and 24 hours a day from 3:29 a.m. on Friday morning to 1:54 a.m. on Sunday morning.

In the 1970s, roughly contemporaneous with the construction of Washington D.C.'s Metro system and San Francisco's Bay Area Rapid Transit, the newly formed Metropolitan Council contemplated the creation of a similar mass transit for the Minneapolis-St. Paul metro area, but the idea was eventually abandoned due to opposition from the Minnesota Legislature. For the next few decades, there were repeated proposals to build light rail along several corridors, particularly the University Avenue corridor between downtown Minneapolis and Saint Paul (the present Green Line), but the idea of light rail only gained steam in the late 1990s.

In 1999, the Minnesota Legislature approved funding for the first line (the present Blue Line) along Hiawatha Avenue (initially named the Hiawatha Line) in south Minneapolis, which opened in 2004. In 2011, in anticipation of the opening of the Red Line and Green Line, and in order to help passengers better identify with each of the routes, Metro Transit announced that the system would be rebranded and each line assigned a unique color. The first phase of the Red Line opened in mid-2013, and the first phase of the Green Line (also known as the Central Corridor) in mid-2014. Expansion is planned to upgrade existing transit corridors and to construct new transitways.

Current system

Lines
  Blue Line: Target Field Station – Minneapolis-St. Paul International Airport – Mall of America
  Green Line: Target Field Station – University of Minnesota – Union Depot
  Orange Line: Downtown Minneapolis – Burnsville Heart of the City
  Red Line: Mall of America – Apple Valley Transit Station
  A Line: 46th Street station – Rosedale Transit Center
  C Line: Downtown Minneapolis – Brooklyn Center Transit Center
  D Line: Mall of America – Brooklyn Center Transit Center

The current Metro system consists of seven Lines. There are two light rail lines: the Blue Line, which runs from Target Field in downtown Minneapolis under Minneapolis-St Paul International Airport to the Mall of America, and the Green Line, which runs from Target Field past the University of Minnesota to Union Depot in downtown Saint Paul. The BRT Red Line serves as an extension of the Blue Line across the Minnesota River, where it connects with southern suburbs at four different stations. Low ridership projections would have made the required bridge for an extension of the Blue Line economically infeasible. The Orange Line is bus rapid transit route that runs along I-35W from Minneapolis south into Richfield, Bloomington and Burnsville. The arterial BRT A, C, and D lines serve as upgrades to existing local bus routes and connect with the Blue and Green lines at certain shared stations.

There are a total of 121 stations; five shared between the Green and Blue Lines in downtown Minneapolis, one shared at the Mall of America between the Blue, Red, and D Lines, one shared at 46th Street station between the Blue and the A Lines, one shared at Snelling Avenue station between the Green and the A Lines, the C and D lines share 3 stations in Brooklyn Center and 6 in Downtown Minneapolis. 13 Stations are exclusively for the Blue Line, 16 for the Green Line, 12 for the Orange Line, 4 for the Red Line, 18 for the A Line, 11 for the C Line, and 30 for the D Line. The main hub of the system is Target Field Station in Minneapolis, Mall of America Station is also a hub, and Saint Paul Union Depot is envisioned as an additional future hub.

Most trains and buses run at least every 15 minutes throughout the day, with reduced schedules at night and on weekends. All stations have electronic displays that show predicted real-time departure information, known as NexTrip. Predicted real-time departure information is also available through Metro Transit's website.

Fares

Metro uses a proof-of-payment system, requiring riders to carry tickets at all times. Fares are purchased before boarding, either at ticket machines located in the stations or by scanning a Go-To card at dedicated pedestals. Tickets are valid for 2 1/2 hours after purchase. An unlimited number of transfers between Metro lines and Metro Transit bus routes, within the same fare level, are allowed within this period. Within the two Downtown Zones of Minneapolis and St. Paul, tickets are 50¢; otherwise they follow normal Metro Transit fares:
Adults: $2.50 rush hour, $2 otherwise
Seniors, Youth, Medicare Card Holders: $2.50 rush hour, $1 otherwise
Persons with Disability: $1
Children under 6: Free with paying rider. Limit is 3.
Express Bus: $3.25 rush hour, $1 otherwise
(Rush hour is classified as Monday - Friday, 6-9 am & 3-6:30 pm)

In addition, passes are available for various lengths of time or numbers of trips at appropriate discounts.

All University of Minnesota undergraduate and graduate students (that pay the Transportation and Safety fee) are provided a Universal Transit Pass through their U-Cards. This allows Student-IDs to be used for unlimited rides on all regular route transit busses, Light Rail and Bus Rapid Transit, as well a reduced fare on the Northstar Line commuter rail.  Staff at the Twin Cities Campus may be eligible for a Metropass, this pass allows all the same benefits as the Universal Transit Pass, without the fare reduction on the Northstar Line. As of January 2023, cost of this pass is $83 per month. This will reach a break even point after between 26 and 33 trips per month. 

Passengers at Minneapolis-St Paul International Airport can use the  Blue Line between the Terminal 1-Lindbergh station and Terminal 2–Humphrey station free of charge. These two stations are served 24/7.

Future
Several expansion projects are planned for the Metro system, at various stages of completion.  These include both light rail extensions and connecting bus rapid transit services. Other Transit projects are under planning stages by other organizations in the region, these may be operated or integrated in the METRO system in the future.

Under construction

The Green Line extension (also known as the Southwest LRT) is a under construction expansion of the Green Line, to run from Target Field Station to several southwestern suburbs. The project was given federal approval in November 2018, and ground was broken on construction on November 30, 2018.  Completion of the project is expected in 2027, at an expected cost of over US$2 billion. It will be the largest infrastructure project in state history.

The Gold Line is an under construction bus rapid transit route to run along Interstate 94 from Woodbury to downtown Saint Paul along Mounds Boulevard. Once in downtown it would travel from the Saint Paul Union Depot, through downtown before terminating near United Hospital.  The project will use dedicated lanes while running along I-94. Construction on the project began in October 2022 with service on the line expected to begin in 2025.

Engineering and environmental assessment phases
The Purple Line is a planned bus rapid transit route to run largely along the Ramsey County Regional Railroad Authority corridor adjacent to the Bruce Vento Regional Trail from downtown Saint Paul to downtown White Bear Lake, Minnesota. The project's Environmental Assessment was released in May 2021 for public comment. The project is currently in an engineering and design phase, this should be complete in 2023. Construction is expected to begin in 2024, with operation beginning in 2026.

The B Line is an arterial bus rapid transit route undergoing engineering and design for the Twin Cities' Lake Street/Marshall Avenue corridor, running from Bde Maka Ska in Minneapolis' Uptown neighborhood  to downtown Saint Paul along Selby Avenue. This line will largely replace route 21 and will connect with ten current or planned METRO Lines, Station design is complete with beginning of construction anticipated in 2023.

The E Line is an arterial bus rapid transit route undergoing engineering and design for the Twin Cities's Hennepin Avenue corridor.  Metro Transit's 2012 rapid bus study identified a route that would run from downtown Minneapolis to a future Lake Street station on the Metro Green Line extension.  However, after further study in the spring of 2019, Metro Transit recommended a route from the Green Line's Stadium Village stop, through Dinkytown to Hennepin Avenue, and then south via Hennepin, 44th Street, and France Avenue to the Southdale Transit Center, replacing most of route 6.  Pending full project funding, E Line construction could begin as soon as 2023.

Planned projects

The Blue Line extension (known as Bottineau LRT) is a planned extension of the Blue Line to Brooklyn Park. After failing to come to an agreement with BNSF over colocating light rail and freight trains in the railroad's corridor, the Metropolitan Council announced they would begin to "explore opportunities to advance this critical project without using BNSF Railway right of way." New alignments for the southern portion of route were presented for public comment in March 2021. 

The F Line is an arterial bus rapid transit route undergoing engineering and design for the Twin Cities's Central Avenue corridor, running from Downtown Minneapolis to Northtown Mall in Blaine, replacing much of route 10. The Line is currently undergoing planning, with engineering and design from expected in 2023-2024, construction is scheduled on track to begin in 2025 with opening planned for 2026.

The Riverview Corridor is a transit corridor connecting Downtown Saint Paul and the Mall of America in Bloomington via the Minneapolis-Saint Paul International Airport. The corridor serves an area from the Saint Paul Union Depot to the Mall via parts of the Metro Green Line and the Metro Blue Line, and a route running parallel to West 7th Street, which runs southwest from Downtown Saint Paul. The corridor creates a triangle connecting opposite ends of the Blue Line and Green Line. In December 2017, a modern streetcar system similar to systems in Portland, Kansas City, and Detroit was selected as the locally preferred alternative with an alignment along West Seventh Street and MN-5.

Proposed projects
The next three arterial bus rapid transit lines have been proposed. The G Line, and H Line would serve the  corridor, Rice Street and Robert Street corridors, and an alignment from downtown Minneapolis to the East Side of Saint Paul along Como Avenue respectively. The three lines are planned to be built by 2030.

There are also numerous proposals in early planning stages for routes along Interstate 394 from Minneapolis to Wayzata, Highway 169 from Minneapolis to Shakopee, Interstate 35 from Minneapolis and St. Paul to Forest Lake, Highway 36 from St. Paul to Stillwater and Highway 61 from St. Paul to Hastings (Red Rock Corridor).

Operations

The Metro system's rail lines use a combination of exclusive and shared right-of-way, depending on the circumstances. Within the two Downtown Zones, trains run on surface streets in an exclusive right-of-way, without preemption. The Blue Line runs primarily alongside Hiawatha Avenue (Minnesota State Highway 55), along land originally acquired for expansion of that highway, except for a brief stretch in a tunnel underneath Minneapolis-St Paul International Airport. The Green Line runs along the median of University Avenue in an exclusive right-of-way, except for a brief stretch of the Washington Avenue Transit Mall where its tracks are shared with buses. The Blue Line's at-grade crossings are protected by automated grade crossing gates; the Green Line's crossings move in regular traffic, with signal priority but no preemption.

Since the completion of three-car station extensions in winter 2010, Metro Transit operates one-, two- and three-car trains on the Blue Line, depending on the time of day and ridership needs. Many stations on the line were initially built to be capable of serving only one- or two-car trains, as a cost-saving measure; all of the shorter platforms were designed and built with future extension in mind and currently all stations are capable of serving three-car trains. The Green Line was built with three-car platforms at all stations.

Rolling stock

Currently three models of LRVs run in the Metro system.

Type I LRVs are Bombardier Flexity Swifts, utilizing a low floor for accessible boarding at all stations. Metro Transit operates 27 vehicles on the lines, numbered 101 through 127. Initially painted with Metro Transit livery, all have been repainted as of 2015 to reflect the Metro system branding. During this time, Type I cars also were retrofitted with colored LCD headboards for route destination displays and other improvements.

Type II LRVs are Siemens S70/Avantos. 64 vehicles were purchased, primarily to serve the Green Line. Type II LRVs are mechanically, but not electronically, compatible with the current fleet of 27 "type I" vehicles, so while the two generations do run on the tracks at the same time and both types are able to push a malfunctioning unit of the other type, multiple-unit consists may only be assembled of one type.

Type III LRVS are Siemens S700. In 2016, Metro Transit placed an order for 27 more Siemens S70 LRVs for its planned Southwest Corridor expansion. The cars in this order were considered to be model S70 at the time the order was placed, but in 2019/20 were retroactively rebranded as model S700 by Siemens. These used a modified center-truck design that allowed sideways-facing seating in the center section, for better passenger flow. In 2018, Siemens adopted a new model number, S700, for S70 LRVs that used the new center-section design, and in 2020 it retroactively applied the new designation to all previous S70 LRVs built to the new design; as a result, all of Metro Transit's type III LRVs (301–327) are now Siemens model S700.  The first two S700 vehicles arrived in May 2020.

See also

 Northstar Line
 Metro Transit (Minnesota)
 Minneapolis Streetcar System
 List of tram and light rail transit systems
 List of United States light rail systems by ridership
 List of North American light rail systems by ridership

References

External links

 What is METRO?

Public transportation in Minnesota
Light rail in Minnesota
Electric railways in Minnesota
Bus rapid transit in Minnesota
Transportation in Minneapolis–Saint Paul
Metro Transit (Minnesota)